Michelle Oluwatomi Akanbi (born September 17, 1997), better known as Töme, is a Nigerian-French Canadian singer, songwriter and actor born in Montreal, Quebec, Canada. In 2020, Tome won the 2021 edition of the Juno awards for her single ‘I Pray’ ft Sean Kingston and have shared stage with African superstars like Burna boy, Wizkid, Mr Eazi and also collaborated with pop stars like King Promise, Runtown, Zlatan, Wavy the Creator and Sean Kingston.

Early life 
Töme was born on September 17, 1997, in Montreal, Canada to a Nigerian father from Osun state and Canadian mother. She began singing at the age of 8 and picked up the guitar at age 10 in Brampton, Ontario where she grew up. She grew up listening to artists like Erykah Badu, Lauren Hill, Wizkid, and Alicia Keys who become her music influence.

Career 
Before starting music, Töme worked with a software company named ’Tran Score’ as a customer service representative and had to quit the job to pursue her passion for music. In 2015, she released her debut EP ’One with Self’ on SoundCloud. This was followed by her sophomore EP titled Tömesroom: Chapter 1 and in 2020, she released her debut album titled BT4W (Bigger Than Four Walls) featuring artists like Wavy The Creator, King promise, Runtown and Zlatan. She also released a new single ‘I Pray’ in 2020 tome featuring Sean Kingston. Her third EP Dreams was released on June 25, 2021; with her sophomore album Löv being released on February 28, 2022.

She is also an actress and has featured in movies like Fear Thy Roommate, Clash and Love in Transition.

Discography

Albums 
 Bigger Than Four Walls (2020)
 Löv (2022)

Extended plays
 One with Self (2015)
 Tömesroom: Chapter 1 (2019)
 Dreams (2020)

Singles 

 “Up and away” (2015)
 "Existing" (2015)
 "Numbers" (2015)
 "L'amour" (2019)
 "The Money" (2020)
 "Better Than That" (2020)
 "Livin" (2020)
 "i Pray" (2020)
 "Nana" (2021)

Awards and nominations

References 

21st-century Black Canadian women singers
Living people
1997 births
Canadian reggae musicians
Juno Award for Reggae Recording of the Year winners
Canadian people of Nigerian descent